Affæren Birte is a 1945 Danish family film directed by Lau Lauritzen Jr. and Alice O'Fredericks.

Cast
 Poul Reumert - Dr.med. Hans Ellekær
 Anna Borg - Martha Ellekær
 Verna Olesen - Birte Ellekær
 Ib Schønberg - Laboratorieassistent
 Tove Grandjean - Fru Hammer
 Bente Lange - Lisbeth Hammer
 Birgit Nielsen - En veninde
 Ilselil Larsen - Anne
 Edouard Mielche - Blikkenslager Brømer
 Karl Jørgensen - Retsformand
 Per Buckhøj - Anklager
 Poul Petersen - Forsvarer
 Elith Pio - Opdagerchef
 Asbjørn Andersen - Politikommissær
 Aage Winther-Jørgensen - Professor Olesen
 Henry Nielsen - Opsynsmand
 Irwin Hasselmann - En vred herre
 Lotte Hasselmann - En vaskekone

References

External links

1945 films
1940s Danish-language films
Danish black-and-white films
Films directed by Lau Lauritzen Jr.
Films directed by Alice O'Fredericks
Films scored by Sven Gyldmark